Singer Sower is the studio album by 2nd Chapter of Acts, released in 1983. It was recorded at Easter Song Studio in Garden Valley, Texas. As with all 2nd Chapter of Acts recordings, it was engineered and produced by Buck Herring.

Track listing
From Discogs and MusicStack.

Personnel 

2nd Chapter of Acts
 Annie Herring – vocals, acoustic piano, vocal arrangements 
 Nelly Greisen – vocals, vocal arrangements 
 Matthew Ward – vocals, guitar, vocal arrangements

Musicians
 Kerry Livgren – synthesizers, guitars 
 Michael Omartian – pianos, synthesizers, synth solos, arrangements (1, 7, 5)
 Si Simonson – pianos
 Dean Harrington – guitars 
 John Scudder – bass
 Leland Sklar – bass
 Jack Kelly – drums, Simmons drums

Kerry Livgren was not part of the band but appeared as a courtesy from CBS Records.

Production 
 Buck Herring – producer, engineer 
 John Guess – engineer
 Frank Wolf – engineer
 Eddie Yip – artwork

References

1983 albums
2nd Chapter of Acts albums